Metro Davao, officially called Metropolitan Davao, is a metropolitan area in the Mindanao island group, Philippines. It includes the cities of Davao City, Digos, Mati, Panabo, Samal and Tagum and spanned parts of all five provinces of Davao Region. Metro Davao is one of three metropolitan areas in the Philippines. It is administered by Metropolitan Davao Development Authority. It is the largest metropolitan region by land area and the second most populous in the Philippines.

History

Comparison to other Philippines' metropolitan regions
The agglomeration of Metro Davao has no formal legal framework early on its initial stage of development process either by an act of Congress, by an executive declaration of the President or by a formal agreement among component cities and municipalities of the metropolitan area.

In the case of Metro Manila, the component cities and municipalities were grouped into a province through a decree issued by then-President Ferdinand Marcos, and designated the then First Lady Imelda Marcos as a governess. From then on, Greater Manila, as it was known earlier, became Metro Manila.

To formalize its juridical identity, Congress passed into law Republic Act No. 7924, instituting the Metropolitan Manila Development Authority. Under the current law, the head of the agency shall be appointed by the President and should not be on a concurrent elected position as mayor.

Metro Cebu is a concept created in the 70's and formally adopted by the Regional Development Council of Central Visayas as a platform for integrating parallel development in the metropolitan area.

Formation of the Metropolitan Area
Although Metro Davao was formed in 1995 by Mayor Rodrigo Duterte, the mayor of Davao City at that time, it does not have the birth perspective of either Metro Cebu or Metro Manila. The metropolitan concept of Metro Davao is being spearheaded by the mayor but no formal agreement or an act of congress have been executed to formalize its legal and juridical identity. Because of this, the region, having no official legal framework (although they have a de facto one, the Davao Regional Development Council), exists not as a juridical identity but only as an informal reference to the area. However, the said council have formally adopted the concept in 1996 for the development of the area, especially Davao City.

President Rodrigo Duterte signed Republic Act No. 11708 on April 27, 2022, paving the way for the establishment of the Metro Davao Development Authority which would oversee the administration and planning in the metropolitan area.

Government

Prior to the creation of the Metropolitan Davao Development Authority in 2022, Metro Davao had its three own development and governance councils, namely: Davao Integrated Development Program Board, Metropolitan Davao Committee, and Metropolitan Davao Management Office. Davao Integrated Development Program Board served as the metropolitan area's development council, since Metro Davao not only defines the LGUs in the said metropolitan area, but also all of Davao Region. As such, it was not an administrative political unit but an agglomeration of independent local government units, the third level government in the Philippine political system. With Republic Act No. 11708 signed into effect in 2022 however, the then newly created Metropolitan Davao Development Authority will replace the provisional entities that are overseeing the affairs of the metropolis, thus effectively turning Metro Davao into an administrative political unit in the same level as Metro Manila. It is considered to be a special development and administrative region.

Definitions of Metro Davao
As years passed on, the definitions of Metro Davao had changed in recent years. Metro Davao, as of now, has taken on three identical geographical definitions, namely:

The metropolitan area is synonymous with Davao City itself, since the city is the largest city in the world by land area (244,000 hectares or 942 square miles), and encompasses more than six times the size of Metro Manila and three times the size of Metro Cebu.
The metropolitan area encompasses Davao City and its neighboring cities and towns of Tagum, Panabo, Digos, and Samal, Carmen, and Santa Cruz.
The metropolitan area refers to Davao City and its nearby five provinces, namely: Davao de Oro, Davao del Norte, Davao Oriental, Davao del Sur, and Davao Occidental
Note

Component Local Government Units

Geography and demographics
The metropolitan area has 6,492.84 km2, making it the largest metropolitan area in the Philippines in terms of land area. It also has a population of 3,062,291 in the combined population sizes of the local government units that make up the metropolitan area during the 2015 census, making it the second most populous metropolitan area in the country after Metro Manila and the most populous in the entire Visayas-Mindanao region.

Most of the region's inhabitants speak Cebuano. English is the medium of instruction in schools and is widely understood by residents, who often use it in varying professional fields. Aside from Cebuano, Chavacano and Hiligaynon are also widely used in addition to languages indigenous to the city, such as the Giangan, the Kalagan, the Tagabawa, the Matigsalug, the Ata Manobo, and the Obo. Other languages spoken in the city include Maguindanao, Maranao, Sama-Bajau, Iranun, Tausug, and Ilokano. A linguistic phenomenon has developed whereby locals have either shifted to Filipino or significantly mix Filipino terms and grammar into their Cebuano speech, because the older generations speak Filipino to their children in home settings, and Cebuano is spoken in everyday settings, making Filipino the secondary lingua franca.

Economy
The economy of Metro Davao is one of the largest in the country and the most economically active in Mindanao. Davao City, from which the metropolitan area is centered, is known as the Crown Jewel of Mindanao due to its status as the premier city, the financial and trade center, and hub of Mindanao.

There are several industrial and business establishments within the metropolitan area as well. Industrial plants in Davao City, Santa Cruz, and Digos generate income for their respective LGU's as well as for the locals living there. Banana plantations in the northern part of the metropolitan area also contribute to the metropolitan, as well as the national, economy. Local fruits such as durians, mangoes, pineapples, and mangosteens are also exported abroad.

List of LGUs in Metro Davao by annual income

Agriculture
Davao City is one of the country's leading producers and exporters of durian, mangoes, pomeloes, banana, coconut products, papaya, mangosteen, and even flowers. Panabo hosts one of the country's biggest banana plantations, which is owned by the Tagum Agricultural Development Company (TADECO) that covers around 6,900 hectares of banana fields. Digos is popular for the mangoes produced in the city.

Infrastructure

Transportation 

 Airport
Metro Davao, as a whole, is being served by Davao City's Francisco Bangoy International Airport. It is the largest and the most developed airport on the island of Mindanao. It comes second for having the longest runway in the island at 3,000 meters after that of General Santos International Airport. The airport is currently the third busiest airport in the country after Ninoy Aquino International Airport and Mactan–Cebu International Airport, and the busiest in Mindanao. This international facility is one of the domestic hubs of Philippines AirAsia, Cebu Pacific Air, and Philippine Airlines. Presently, the airport serves flights to Manila, Cebu, Iloilo, Cagayan de Oro, Zamboanga,  Pampanga, Bacolod, Tagbilaran, Tacloban, Puerto Princesa, Caticlan and as far as Singapore, Hong Kong, Quanzhou (suspended), and Doha. So far, Davao's ATC Tower is considered the most sophisticated in the country.

 Seaport

Three of the four main seaports in the region operate in Metro Davao, namely: Sasa International Seaport in Sasa and Santa Ana Pier in the Chinatown District, both in Davao City; and Panabo Seaport in Davao del Norte. The former two, both of which are located in Port of Davao in Davao City, can service both interisland and international shipments. Sasa International Container Port, also located in the Davao International Seaport, is one of the busiest in the entire Visayas-Mindanao region.

 Tagum-Davao-Digos Railway

 Overland
Located near Quimpo, the Davao Overland Transport Terminal, connected to the Capital Manila by buses, Philtranco Flag Carrier Bus, PP Bus Line, and from the Visayas the Bachelor Tours. To the south by Mindanao Star passing Digos, General Santos, Koronadal, Shariff Aguak via SurAllah, Cotabato, and Others to the south, the Yellow Bus also serves to the south via an Inter-National Highway.

Energy

Cities of Davao and Panabo, together with the municipality of Carmen is electrified and is served by Davao Light an AboitizPower Distribution Utilities subsidiary.

Sanitation

Davao City has its own water service. An inter Regional Water Service and Development from Compostela Valley Region specifically Nabunturan.

Davao City and Panabo share its sanitary landfill at Barangay Carmen vicinity while the town of Carmen and Tagum has their own near Tagum city boundary.

Education
Metro Davao has a number of educational institutions catering to the needs of its residents. These colleges and universities are mostly found in Davao City. There are also a number of international schools that serve the metro. Here are some notable institutions in Metro Davao.

Public
Davao del Norte State College (1995)
Southern Philippines Agri-Business and Marine and Aquatic School of Technology (1982)
University of Southeastern Philippines (1978)
University of the Philippines Mindanao (1995)

Private

Media
Davao City, having over a million night-time population and an estimated 4 million day-time population is home to many media outlets and Large media networks, maintain their respective local stations and branches for viewership, commercial and news coverage purposes. Most of these stations broadcast local news and public affairs as well as entertainment and dramas to cater to the local viewers.

TV Stations
TV5 Davao Channel 2 (TV5 Network, Inc.)
ABS-CBN TV-4 Davao (ABS-CBN Corporation)
GMA TV-5 Davao (GMA Network, Inc.)
SBN/ETC TV-7 Davao (Southern Broadcasting Network)
RPN/CNN Philippines TV-9 Davao (Radio Philippines Network)
PTV-11 Davao (People's Television Network)
IBC TV-13 Davao (Intercontinental Broadcasting Corporation)
S+A Channel 21 Davao (ABS-CBN Corporation)
RJTV Channel 23 (Rajah Broadcasting Network)
Hope Channel 25 Davao (Hope Channel Philippines)
GTV Channel 27 Davao (GMA Network, Inc.)
One Sports Channel 29 (Nation Broadcasting Corporation/TV5 Network, Inc)
BEAM TV-31 Davao (Broadcast Enterprises and Affiliated Media)
RHTV 33 Davao (Manila Broadcasting Company)
Net25 Channel 39 Davao (Eagle Broadcasting Corporation)
GNN TV-41 Davao (Global Satellite Technology Services)
SMNI TV-43 Davao (Sonshine Media Network International)
DCBN Channel 45 (Davao Christian Bible Channel)
UNTV Channel 51 Davao (Progressive Broadcasting Corporation)

Cable and Satellite TV Operators
Sky Cable Davao - Davao City
Davao Cableworld Network – Davao City
Eastcoast Cable TV Network - Davao City and Mati City
Digos Cable TV Network - Digos
Prime Cable Network - Digos and Samal
Wise Cable TV Network - Tagum and Maco
Love Net TV – Tagum
Panabo Satellite Cable TV - Panabo, Carmen and Samal
Asymmetrical Cable TV Network - Carmen and Padada
G Sat Cable
Sky Direct
Cignal TV

Aside from the 24 national daily newspapers available, Davao City also has 21 local newspapers. Among the widely read are the Sun Star Davao, Mindanao Times, and the Mindanao Examiner.

See also 

 Metro Manila
 Metro Cebu
 Metro Clark

References

D
Davao City